William J. MacDonald may refer to:

 William J. MacDonald (producer)
 William John Macdonald (1832–1916), Canadian merchant and politician
 William Johnson McDonald (1844–1926), American banker who endowed an astronomical observatory
 William Josiah MacDonald (1873–1946), Michigan politician

See also
William MacDonald (disambiguation)